Linsleya is a genus of blister beetles in the family Meloidae. There are about five described species in Linsleya.

Species
These five species belong to the genus Linsleya:
 Linsleya californica Selander, 1955
 Linsleya compressicornis (Horn, 1870)
 Linsleya convexa (LeConte, 1853)
 Linsleya sphaericollis (Say, 1824) (ash blister beetle)
 Linsleya suavissima (Wellman, 1910)

References

Further reading

 
 
 

Meloidae
Articles created by Qbugbot